The 2013 BMW PGA Championship was the 59th edition of the BMW PGA Championship, an annual golf tournament on the European Tour, contested 23–26 May at Wentworth Club in Surrey, England. Matteo Manassero  of Italy won the tournament on the fourth hole of a sudden-death playoff with Simon Khan and Marc Warren.

Course layout

Past champions in the field

Made the cut

Missed the cut

Nationalities in the field

Round summaries

First round
Thursday, 23 May 2013
Friday, 24 May 2013

Second round
Friday, 24 May 2013

Third round
Saturday, 25 May 2013

Fourth round
Sunday, 26 May 2013

Playoff 
Sunday, 26 May 2013

References

External links
Coverage on European Tour

BMW PGA Championship
Golf tournaments in England
BMW PGA Championship
BMW PGA Championship
BMW PGA Championship